The King Hamad Order of the Renaissance is the third highest civilian honour of Bahrain decoration named after King Hamad.

History 
The award was founded by King Hamad II on 17 April 2008, to recognize services towards the development of the country.

Class 
The King Hamad Order of the Renaissance is awarded in three classes;
 First Class – awarded to foreign leaders, prime ministers, crown princes, parliamentary chiefs, ministers or those of equal rank
 Second Class – awarded to civil servants and military personnel for contribution in the nation's development since 2001
 Third Class – awarded to those who have helped develop women's rights and human rights

Recipients 

 Khalifa bin Salman Al Khalifa, the Prime Minister of Bahrain 
 Hussein, Crown Prince of Jordan, the Crown Prince of Jordan (2019)
 Narendra Modi, the Prime Minister of India (2019)

References 

Civil awards and decorations of Bahrain
Awards established in 2008
2008 establishments in Bahrain
Orders of chivalry awarded to heads of state, consorts and sovereign family members